Staré Těchanovice is a municipality and village in Opava District in the Moravian-Silesian Region of the Czech Republic. It has about 100 inhabitants.

Administrative parts

The area of the former spa of Jánské Koupele is an administrative part of Staré Těchanovice.

History
The first written mention of Staré Těchanovice is from 1377.

References

External links

Villages in Opava District